The Manila Railway 100 class, of 1906 were five 4-4-2 Atlantic-type steam locomotives built by the North British Locomotive Company. They were the flagship locomotives of the Manila Railway during the late 1900s and throughout the 1910s, being the first tender-hauling locomotives in Philippine service. They hauled the Baguio Special, an express service between Manila and Baguio via Damortis station in Rosario, La Union.

The locomotives were relegated to freight services in the 1920s, hauling sugarcane trains in Central Luzon until they were scrapped after 1948.

Background
The Manila Railway Company, ancestor of the Philippine National Railways, operated solely tank locomotives on the Ferrocarril de Manila a Dagupan (now the North Main Line) through much of its early history. These locomotives burned wood fuel instead of using coal. Horace L. Higgins, a British engineer who was the head of the Manila Railway, ordered the modernization of its entire fleet. This would include the acquisition of bigger locomotives of the  range and purchase of heavier track.

Neilson and Company and Dübs and Company, builders of the preceding Dagupan class, merged with another Glasgow-based manufacturer to form the North British Locomotive Company during this period. The Manila Railway then approached the newly formed manufacturer to build what would become the 100 class, as well as a series of tank locomotives named the 70 class.

Design
Having entered in 1906, the 100 class was the first tender-hauling steam locomotive in the Philippines. It used the 4-4-2 Atlantic wheel arrangement, which was a popular among express trains during the 1900s.

The design of the locomotives were built to Higgins' expectations in mind, especially to its weight.

Its most notable feature is the use of a cab for both the locomotive and the tender. This cab design would later influence the 2-8-0 Consolidation-type 130 class of 1912 and the first batch of the 4-6-0 Ten-wheeler-type Manila Railroad 45 class of 1919. Both of these succeeding designs were tender locomotives.

Another notable feature is the Americanized tender design, having four axles compared to three as used in all British locomotives of the era.

Service

The 100 class was promoted as the flagship locomotive of the Manila Railway during their introduction in the late 1900s. They appeared on various advertisements for the Baguio Special, a mixed train-bus service between Manila and Baguio via Damortis station in Rosario, La Union. It also appeared on the header of the Manila Railway's bond documents.

Retirement
As later stated by The Locomotive Magazine, the locomotives had their brief heyday as the premiere express train locomotives, a fate shared by other locomotives of the same wheel type. By 1916, the Insular Government acquired the Manila Railway and merged into the New Jersey-based Manila Railroad Company. Henry Bayard McCoy, a United States Army colonel and a member of the Republican National Committee for the Philippines, replaced Higgins as general manager.

The new administration ushered the acquisition of more powerful locomotives from the United States. These new locomotives started entering service by 1919 and have largely replaced the aging British locomotives in mainline service for the next decades.

The Baguio Special and the newly inaugurated Bicol Express between Manila and Quezon province has then been hauled by the newly acquired Manila Railroad 45 class. Since 1922, the 100 and 120 classes were transferred to freight trains carrying sugarcane.

The class was last seen in 1947 when F. Unson, the superintendent of the Manila Railroad Mechanical Department of the time, reported that at least one 100 class member was still operational. In 1949, ten new Manila Railroad 100 class locomotives of the 4-8-2 wheel arrangement built by the Pennsylvanian Vulcan Iron Works entered service. These new locomotives replaced seven of 10 Manila Railroad 170 class locomotives of the same wheel type that were destroyed by World War II. Having successfully operated passenger and freight services on the North Main Line in which the original 100 class ran, the Atlantics were pulled from service. Sometime later, the Manila Railroad ordered the surviving units to be scrapped.

References

Rolling stock of the Philippines
3 ft 6 in gauge locomotives
Railway locomotives introduced in 1906
4-4-2 locomotives
NBL locomotives